The Minister for Finance of Sweden, officially Cabinet Minister and Head of the Ministry of Finance, is a member of the Government of Sweden and is the head of the Ministry of Finance.

It is often considered to be the most influential political office in Sweden, following the Prime Minister.

List of officeholders

Status

See also
Lord High Treasurer of Sweden (historical antecedent)

Footnotes

References

External links
 www.sweden.gov.se/sb/d/2062

 
Lists of political office-holders in Sweden
1840 establishments in Sweden
Government agencies established in 1840